Jolleyn (also Romanized as Jolleyn, Jolīn, and Jollīn) is a village in Robat Rural District, in the Central District of Sabzevar County, Razavi Khorasan Province, Iran. At the 2006 census, its population was 467, in 148 families.

References 

Populated places in Sabzevar County